Sadıqlı (also, Sadykhly) is a village in the Tovuz Rayon of Azerbaijan.  The village forms part of the municipality of Yanıqlı.

References 

Populated places in Tovuz District